The 2020–21 Georgia U.S. Senate runoff may refer to:

 2020 United States Senate election in Georgia, a runoff election for the regularly-scheduled November election to fill the Class II Georgia U.S. Senate seat
 2020 United States Senate special election in Georgia, a runoff election for the remaining two years of the Class III Georgia U.S. Senate seat, to January 2023.